Meraldene is a village in Algeria.

Meraldene may also refer to:
 Meraldene Dam, a dam in Algeria
 Meraldene River, a river in Algeria